The Professional Lighting Designers' Association (PLDA), formerly known as European Lighting Designers' Association (ELDA+), is an international association of architectural lighting designers. Based in Gütersloh, Germany, the organisation was originally created as a European entity. However, since its founding in 1994, the organisation has expanded beyond the boundaries of Europe and has many members outside of Europe in Asia and North America. In the year 2014, PLDA was liquidated as a result of insolvency.

PLDA is a voluntary federation of lighting designers and lighting consultants who are active on an international scale. Their purpose is to increase the reputation of the profession and to establish the profession as such in its own right.

Founding
The Professional Lighting Designers' Association PLDA was founded as the European Lighting Designers' Association ELDA+ in 1994 in Frankfurt/D. The founders were:
 Georges Berne/F
 Johannes Dinnebier/D
 Erwin Döring/D
 Francesco Iannone/I
 Heinrich Kramer/D
 Alison Ritter/UK
 Joachim Ritter/D
 Lucy Rittner/F
 Serena Tellini/I

Membership
Voting members are Fellow members, Professional members and Associate members. The Fellow members are members who are deemed to have excelled in contributing to the Architectural Lighting Design profession and to PLDA. Professional members are those who own an independent practice or work in an independent practice, and have a certain number of years of experience in lighting design. The same applies to Associate members, except their number of years' experience is less.

Non-voting members are Design members (independent, but with little or no experience as an independent designer), Student members and Affiliate members.
Affiliate members are those who are not full-time lighting designers, but are very interested in lighting design or need it for their profession.

Collaboration
PLDA collaborates with other lighting associations, including CIE, IES and other groupings of lighting designers around the world.
With the Institution of Lighting Engineers, PLDA has a partnership agreement, in order to foster deeper understanding between the lighting profession and engineering practitioners.

The official magazine of the organization is the Professional Lighting Design, which is published by the VIA-Verlag. Every member receives the magazine automatically. The VIA-Verlag maintains very close ties with PLDA by, for example, organizing many events for the association.

Education
The Professional Lighting Designers' Association believes that education is the key to establishing Lighting Design as a serious profession. The association thus dedicates a large portion of its time to the organisation and support of education programmes at university level. PLDA has an Educators' network. International educators meet on a regular basis. PLDA works closely with many universities around the world, for example at KTH in Stockholm/S, the Hochschule Wismar/D, Fachhochschule Hildesheim/D, Parson's New School of Design in NYC/USA and Bachelor and Masters programmes in many European countries.

The Workshop Programme with up to four major workshops a year gives students and young designers the opportunity to work in teams under the guidance of a professional lighting designer to develop and implement a lighting design concept on a real project. Some universities have these workshops in their curriculum.

The Professional Lighting Designers' Association stages the Light Focus conference once a year, usually in conjunction with a major lighting fair event, e.g. Light+Building in Frankfurt/D or Euroluce in Milan/I. The sessions cover topics of interest and relevance to all those involved in architectural lighting design and bring to light a variety of professional themes.

The Professional Lighting Designers' Association stages the Vox Juventa conference for young designers once a year. The winning speaker receives a money prize.

Workshops
PLDA, hosts a number of practical workshops, which are organized by the event management of VIA publishing, in which various lighting projects are carried out in areas of a selected town or city. In this way, the general public is educated and shown what lighting design means and that it can help to improve the urban nightscape.

The town of Alingsås, Sweden is the most regular partner. In 2009 PLDA and Alingsås celebrated their tenth year of working together.

Others have been carried out in Jyväskylä/FIN, Winterthur/CH, Birmingham/UK, Lüdenscheid/D, Liverpool/UK or Stavanger/N and Notodden/N.

Council
Policy making for PLDA is handled the association's elected council:

 President: Francesco Iannone/I
 Director General: Wim Aalders/NL
 Director of Membership: Tapio Rosenius/FIN
 Director of Education: Jean Sundin/USA
 Director of International Development: James Wallace/AUS
 Director for Standards of Professional Practice: Prof. Dr. Heinrich Kramer/D
 Treasurer
 Director of Sustainability: Giovanni Traverso/I

References

External links
 Professional Lighting Design Magazine
 The Professional Lighting Design Convention

Architectural lighting design
Lighting